The two-stage 2013 MLS Re-Entry Draft took place on December 12, 2013 (Stage 1) and December 18, 2013 (Stage 2). All 19 Major League Soccer clubs were eligible to participate.

The Stage 1 and Stage 2 Drafts were conducted in the same order as the traditional Waiver Draft, with clubs choosing in reverse order of their 2013 Major League Soccer season finish.

Teams selected players who fell under the following circumstances:

 Players who were at least 23 years old, had a minimum of three years of MLS experience, and whose options were not exercised by their club (available at option salary for 2014).
 Players who were at least 25 years old, had a minimum of four years of MLS experience, were out of contract, and whose club did not offer them a contract at their previous salary (available at 2013 salary).
 Players who were at least 30 years old, had a minimum of eight years of MLS experience, were out of contract, and whose club did not wish to re-sign them (available for at least 105 percent of their 2013 salary).

Players who were not selected in the Stage 1 draft were made available for the Stage 2 draft. Clubs that selected players in Stage 2 had to negotiate a new salary with any player not under contract. Players not selected in either stage were free to negotiate with any club.

Teams also had the option of passing on their selection.

Available players
Players were required to meet age and service requirements to participate as stipulated by the terms of the MLS Collective Bargaining Agreement. The league released a list of all players available for the draft on December 9, 2013.

Stage One
The first stage of the 2013 MLS Re-Entry Draft took place on December 12, 2013.

Round 1

Round 2
Only teams which selected a player in Round 1 were eligible for a pick in Round 2.

Round 3
Only teams which selected a player in Rounds 1 and 2 were eligible for a pick in Round 3.

Stage 1 Trade

Stage Two
The second stage of the 2013 MLS Re-Entry Draft took place on December 18, 2013.

Round 1

Round 2
Only teams which selected a player in Round 1 were eligible for a pick in Round 2.

Round 3
Only teams which selected a player in Rounds 1 and 2 were eligible for a pick in Round 3.

References

Categories 

Major League Soccer drafts
Mls Re-entry Draft, 2013
MLS Re-Entry Draft